Park Hyung-soo is a South Korean actor. He is known for his roles in dramas such as Arthdal Chronicles, The Devil Judge, Crash Landing on You and Happiness. He also appeared in movies Confidential Assignment, The Chase, Hit-and-Run Squad, Kingmaker and Confidential Assignment 2: International.

Personal life 
Hyung-soo married his non-celebrity girlfriend in a private ceremony in April 6th, 2019 at Seoul.

Filmography

Television series

Film

Web series

Stage

Musical

Theatre

Music video appearances

References

External Links 
 
 

1980 births
Living people
People from Seoul
Male actors from Seoul
21st-century South Korean male actors
South Korean male models
South Korean male television actors
South Korean male film actors